Daniel Augustus Joseph Sullivan (July 31, 1884 – January 27, 1941) was a United States Naval Reserve officer and a recipient of the United States military's highest decoration—the Medal of Honor—for his actions in World War I.

Biography
Sullivan attended Clemson College and graduated as part of the Class of 1902.

Sullivan enrolled in the United States Naval Reserve Force on April 12, 1917, a few days after the United States entered World War I. He later received a commission to the rank of Ensign. For this act, he was awarded the Medal of Honor.

Promoted to Lieutenant in September 1918, he served with the U.S. Navy Headquarters in London, England, during the months following the November 1918 armistice. He attained the rank of Lieutenant Commander before leaving the Naval Reserve Force. Sullivan died at age 56 and was buried at Arlington National Cemetery, Arlington County, Virginia. He was survived by his wife, Eva Tilton (1877—1973).

Medal of Honor citation
Rank and organization: Ensign, U.S. Naval Reserve Force. Born: July 31, 1884, Charleston, S.C. Appointed from: South Carolina.

Citation:

For extraordinary heroism as an officer of the U.S.S. Cristabel in conflict with an enemy submarine on May 21, 1918. As a result of the explosion of a depth bomb dropped near the submarine, the Christabel was so badly shaken that a number of depth charges which had been set for firing were thrown about the deck and there was imminent danger that they would explode. Ens. Sullivan immediately fell on the depth charges and succeeded in securing them, thus saving the ship from disaster, which would inevitably have caused great loss of life.

See also

List of Medal of Honor recipients
List of Medal of Honor recipients for World War I

References

1884 births
1941 deaths
American military personnel of World War I
United States Navy Medal of Honor recipients
Military personnel from Charleston, South Carolina
United States Navy officers
Clemson University alumni
Burials at Arlington National Cemetery
World War I recipients of the Medal of Honor